W. Hansraj Saxena is the CEO of the News J Channel. He  is the former Deputy Managing Director of Sun Pictures, an Indian film distribution and production company, subsidiary of Sun Group and a division of Sun TV Network.

Early life
Hansraj Saxena holds a bachelor's degree in physics from Loyola College, Chennai. When he joined Sun Group, he was employed as a manager of Kungumam magazine.

Sun TV Network
He joined worked in Sun TV Network and their flagship channel, Sun TV. His responsibilities include the production of all in-house programming, overall channel development, brand positioning, promotional activities, content management, market and competitor research and strategic planning. He also became a key person and Deputy Managing Director of Sun Pictures and was responsible for acquiring film distribution rights.

Sun Pictures
He headed Sun Pictures is a film distribution and production studio unit of Chennai based Sun Network owned by Kalanidhi Maran started producing the TV film and distributing low-budget Tamil-language films, Kadhalil Vizhunthen being the first. Later, it went on to become one of the most powerful production, distribution houses in Tamil Cinema.

News J
In 2018, He became the CEO of the newly launched News J Channel.

Filmography
He Handled the following projects in Sun Pictures.

Produced by Sun Pictures

Distributed by Sun Pictures

Sax Pictures
Hansraj Saxena was back to the industry with his new banner Sax Pictures. He is  Producing and distributing Movies with his new banner.

Distribution

Production

References

Living people
Indian television executives
Tamil businesspeople
Sun Group
Year of birth missing (living people)